A muscarinic receptor antagonist (MRA) is a type of anticholinergic agent that blocks the activity of the muscarinic acetylcholine receptor. The muscarinic receptor is a protein involved in the transmission of signals through certain parts of the nervous system, and muscarinic receptor antagonists work to prevent this transmission from occurring. Notably, muscarinic antagonists reduce the activation of the parasympathetic nervous system. The normal function of the parasympathetic system is often summarised as "rest-and-digest", and includes slowing of the heart, an increased rate of digestion, narrowing of the airways, promotion of urination, and sexual arousal. Muscarinic antagonists counter this parasympathetic "rest-and-digest" response, and also work elsewhere in both the central and peripheral nervous systems.

Drugs with muscarinic antagonist activity are widely used in medicine, in the treatment of low heart rate, overactive bladder, respiratory problems such as asthma and COPD, and neurological problems such as Parkinson's disease and Alzheimer's disease. A number of other drugs, such as antipsychotics and the tricyclic family of antidepressants, have incidental muscarinic antagonist activity which can cause unwanted side effects such as difficulty urinating, dry mouth and skin, and constipation.

Acetylcholine (often abbreviated ACh) is a neurotransmitter whose receptors are proteins found in synapses and other cell membranes. Besides responding to their primary neurochemical, neurotransmitter receptors can be sensitive to a variety of other molecules. Acetylcholine receptors are classified into two groups based on this:
 muscarinic, which respond to muscarine
 nicotinic, which respond to nicotine

Most muscarinic receptor antagonists are synthetic chemicals; however, the two most commonly used anticholinergics, scopolamine and atropine, are belladonna alkaloids, and are naturally extracted from plants such as Atropa belladonna, the deadly nightshade. The name "belladonna", Italian for "beautiful lady", is thought to derive from one of the antimuscarinic effects of these alkaloids: they were used by women for cosmetic purposes, to promote dilation of the pupils.

Muscarinic antagonist effects and muscarinic agonist effects counterbalance each other for homeostasis.

Certain muscarinic antagonists can be classified into either long-acting muscarinic receptor antagonists (LAMAs) or short-acting muscarinic receptor antagonists (SAMAs), depending on when maximum effect occurs and for how long the effect persists.

Effects
Scopolamine and atropine have similar effects on the peripheral nervous system. However, scopolamine has greater effects on the central nervous system (CNS) than atropine due to its ability to cross the blood–brain barrier. At higher-than-therapeutic doses, atropine and scopolamine cause CNS depression characterized by amnesia, fatigue, and reduction in rapid eye movement sleep. Scopolamine (Hyoscine) has anti-emetic activity and is, therefore, used to treat motion sickness.

Antimuscarinics are also used as anti-parkinsonian drugs. In parkinsonism, there is imbalance between levels of acetylcholine and dopamine in the brain, involving both increased levels of acetylcholine and degeneration of dopaminergic pathways (nigrostriatal pathway). Thus, in parkinsonism there is decreased level of dopaminergic activity. One method of balancing the neurotransmitters is through blocking central cholinergic activity using muscarinic receptor antagonists.

Atropine acts on the M2 receptors of the heart and antagonizes the activity of acetylcholine. It causes tachycardia by blocking vagal effects on the sinoatrial node. Acetylcholine hyperpolarizes the sinoatrial node; this is overcome by MRAs, and thus they increase the heart rate. If atropine is given by intramuscular or subcutaneous injection, it causes initial bradycardia. This is because when administered intramuscularly or subcutaneously atropine acts on presynaptic M1 receptors (autoreceptors). Uptake of acetylcholine in axoplasm is prevented and the presynaptic nerve releases more acetylcholine into the synapse, which initially causes bradycardia.

In the atrioventricular node, the resting potential is lowered, which facilitates conduction. This is seen as a shortened PR-interval on an electrocardiogram. It has an opposite effect on blood pressure. Tachycardia and stimulation of the vasomotor center causes an increase in blood pressure. But, due to feedback regulation of the vasomotor center, there is a fall in blood pressure due to vasodilation.

Important muscarinic antagonists include atropine, Hyoscyamine, hyoscine butylbromide and hydrobromide, ipratropium, tropicamide, cyclopentolate, pirenzepine and scopalamine.

Muscarinic antagonists such as ipratropium bromide can also be effective in treating asthma, since acetylcholine is known to cause smooth muscle contraction, especially in the bronchi.

Comparison table

Overview

Binding affinities

Anticholinergics

Antihistamines

Antidepressants

Antipsychotics

See also

 Anticholinergic
 Muscarinic agonist
 Nicotinic acetylcholine receptor
 Nicotinic agonist
 Nicotinic antagonist
 Parasympatholytic

References

External links
 Effects of Muscarinic Antagonist
 Atropine (Muscarinic Receptor Antagonist), Cardiovascular Pharmacology Concepts, Richard E. Klabunde, PhD
 
 

 
World Health Organization essential medicines